Çorlu  is a northwestern Turkish city in inland Eastern Thrace that falls under the administration of the Province of Tekirdağ. It is a rapidly growing industrial centre built on flatland located on the motorway Otoyol 3 and off the highway D.100 between Istanbul and Turkey's border with Greece and Bulgaria.

The nearest airport is Tekirdağ-Çorlu Airport (TEQ).

History
Bronze Age relics have been found in various areas of Thrace including Çorlu and by 1000 BC the area was a Phrygian-Greek colony named Tzirallum, Tzirallun, or Tzirallon (Τζίραλλον) . The area was subsequently controlled by the Greeks, Persians, Romans and Byzantines.

During Roman and Byzantine times, the town was referred to as Tzouroulos, or Syrallo. The spelling "Zorolus" is used for the Latinised form of the name of the episcopal see identified with present-day Çorlu in the Catholic Church's list of titular sees. Some writers have identified the Roman town of Caenophrurium (the stronghold of the Caeni and the place where Emperor Aurelian was murdered in 275) with Çorlu, but this seems unlikely as the Antonine Itinerary lists Cenofrurium as two stages and 36 Roman miles closer to Byzantium than Tzirallum, and the Tabula Peutingeriana shows the locations separately. There were important Roman and Byzantine fortifications at Caenophrurium, which was a base for controlling large areas of Thrace.

Ottoman era onwards 
Following a tumultuous early history, Çorlu was brought under Ottoman control by Sultan Murad I, who immediately ordered the destruction of the Roman walls as part of a policy of opening up the town under the Pax Ottomana. In the Ottoman period, the town remained an important staging post on the road from Constantinople to Greece.

The nearby village of Uğraşdere was the site of the battle in which Sultan Beyazid II defeated his son Selim I  in August 1511; a year later Beyazid II was defeated by Selim, becoming the first Ottoman father to be overthrown by his son. Beyazid II died in Çorlu on his way to exile in Dimetoka. Coincidentally, Selim himself died in Çorlu nine years into his reign. Both father and son are buried in Istanbul.

In the late 18th century, when the Ottoman Empire began to decline in both military and economic power, the city found itself at the crossroads of numerous conflicts. Turkish refugees were settled in the city when the Ottomans lost control of Crimea to the Russians. The grandchildren of these refugees met the Russians themselves when Çorlu was briefly occupied by Russian troops during the Russo-Turkish War of 1877-1878. During the Balkan Wars of 1912–1913, Çorlu served as the command post for the Ottoman army, but was taken by Bulgarian troops in December 1912.; it was recaptured by Turkish forces during the Second Balkan War in July 1913. Çorlu was then occupied by Greek troops from 1920 to 1922 during the Turkish War of Independence, but was eventually ceded by Britain in accordance with the armistice of Mudanya.

The city became a part of the Republic of Turkey following its foundation in 1923. It continues to be an important garrison for the Turkish army as the home of the 189th Infantry Regiment.

Çorlu today

The city today is more populous than the provincial capital of Tekirdağ, owing to a population spurt initially caused by the exodus of Turks from Bulgaria in 1989 who complemented the traditional left-leaning, industrial working-class of Çorlu; a second wave of migrants from rural Anatolia came to work in the factories in the 1990s and they now make up much of the conservative populace of the city. There is also small Romani and Jewish communities.  For a while the city also had a population of ethnic Albanians and Bosnians flown in during the Kosovo conflict as part of Turkey and North Macedonia's efforts to aid the populations of former Yugoslavia by offering them temporary asylum.

The town centre consists of a mixture of traditional structures and modern concrete apartment blocks providing public housing, as well as amenities such as basic shopping and fast-food restaurants, and essential infrastructure. However, there is little in the way of culture beyond cinemas and wedding-party venues. The road through the city centre is often congested, as it isn't adequate for the needs of a city of a quarter million people. Local shopping facilities have recently been enhanced by the 25 km2 Orion Mall. There is little to no nightlife but, since Çorlu is close to Istanbul, locals can and often do easily go to "the city" for the weekend.

Çorlu today is a typical Turkish boomtown. The population grew rapidly without proper infrastructure being developed to cope. The city centre has remained almost the same size since the early 1990s when the population started to rise. The prison, the 5th Army Corps, a gas station etc. used to be outside the town before the "boom" but are not part of the city centre. Since around 2000, the eastern side of the city has been filling up with tower blocks which constitute a satellite area. Alongside Omurtak Boulevard on the east side, many facilities appeared (banks, restaurants, malls, police station etc.), creating a second "centre" and reducing the need to travel to the actual centre.

Attractions 
Çorlu has very little to show for its past although the simple  Fatih Mosque does date back to 1453 and he Süleymaniye Mosque to 1521. In 1970, the town's one synagogue was converted into the Yeni Camii (New Mosque). It was restored in accordance with the original design and without changing the ceiling decorations or column capitals.

Economy
With more than 300 factories, Çorlu is a major textile-producing town, with Levi's and Mavi Jeans being among the companies that have factories here as well as large outlet centres intended to attract consumers from all over Thrace and Istanbul (Levi's closed its Çorlu factory in August 2014). 

Çorlu also produces foodstuffs and soft drinks like Coca-Cola, and Unilever products like Algida ice-cream and Calvé condiments. As of 2009, Hewlett-Packard and Foxconn Group have formed a joint venture to build a large factory and production complex that will enable the two companies to use Çorlu, and Turkey in general, as the hub of their production activities for Eastern Europe and the Middle East.

International relations

Çorlu is twinned with:

Notes

References

External links

Towns in Turkey
Populated places in Tekirdağ Province
Jewish communities in Turkey
Districts of Tekirdağ Province